The discography of K. Michelle, an American R&B recording artist, consists of five studio albums, eighteen singles, five mixtapes, six guest appearances, and eighteen music videos.

Albums

Studio albums

Soundtrack albums

Extended plays

Mixtapes

Singles

As lead artist

As featured artist

Promotional singles

Guest appearances

Videography

Music videos

Guest appearances

Notes

References

Discography
Discographies of American artists
Rhythm and blues discographies
Soul music discographies